Dysna is a village in the eastern part of Ignalina district in Lithuania. According to the 2011 census, it had 62 residents. The village is situated on the right bank of the river Dysna, which gives the village its name. The village has a chapel, section of Didžiasalis school, and public library.

The nearby clay deposit is one of three largest in Lithuania and was used commercially in 1974–95.

The Lithuanian national and political activist and parliament member Augustinas Voldemaras was born and lived in the village.

Gallery

Landscape in Dysna

References 

Ignalina District Municipality
Villages in Utena County
Sventsyansky Uyezd
Wilno Voivodeship (1926–1939)